The bowling competition of the 2007 Pan American Games in Rio de Janeiro, Brazil was held at the Barra Bowling Center from July 23 to July 26. There were 4 events on offer.

Medal summary

Medal table

Events

See also
2007 Pan American Games

References
2007 Pan American Games results book

Pan American Games
Events at the 2007 Pan American Games
2007